John Daw (1870–1965) was the last surviving U.S. Army Indian Scout veteran that had served in the Indian Wars.  He was a Navajo Indian given the Navajo name  at birth.  His parents, grandparents, as well as other close relatives were part of the Long Walk of the Navajo to Fort Sumner, and were confined with the other Navajo at Fort Sumner in the 1860s.

He enlisted in the U.S. Army on May 7, 1891, with the name John Daw.  He was assigned to the U.S. Army 2nd Cavalry, which was posted at Fort Wingate in the New Mexico Territory.  After being issued uniforms, guns, ammunition, and horses, he felt the cavalry soldiers' training was very thorough.  He stated that the target practice and other military training was continued until they were very highly trained soldiers.  He worked as a tracker, specifically looking for Apache Indians, and he served in this capacity until he left the service on December 5, 1894.

In the last years of his life he lived in a hogan with his wife at the Red Lake Trading Post near Tonalea, Arizona on Navajo Nation land.  At that time, he was a sheep herder, drove his own wagon, and claimed he could hear an approaching automobile from 10 miles away, although his eyesight was no longer good.  His wife Susie's eyesight was good, but her hearing was poor.

He died in 1965, and he was buried on Navajo Nation land in Coconino County, Arizona.  His grave site is in Red Lake, and it is listed as a historic grave site in the county.  There is also a mountain summit named after him called John Daw Mesa, which is located just east of Red Lake.

See also

 Last surviving United States war veterans
 Frederick Fraske

References

1870 births
1965 deaths
American people of the Indian Wars
United States Army soldiers
Navajo military personnel
20th-century Native Americans